Lackan is a townland in County Westmeath, Ireland.

Lackan is one of 10 townlands of the civil parish of Lackan in the barony of Corkaree in the Province of Leinster.

The neighbouring townlands are: Clonava and Lackanwood to the north, Donore and Soho to the east, Carrick, Fulmort, Leny and Rathganny to the south and Ballyharney and Grange to the west.

In the 1911 census of Ireland there were 26 houses and 110 inhabitants in the townland.

References

External links
Lackan at the IreAtlas Townland Data Base
Lackan at Townlands.ie
Lackan at Logainm.ie

Townlands of County Westmeath